The Box of Delights is a children's fantasy novel by John Masefield. It is a sequel to The Midnight Folk, and was first published in 1935. Also known as "When The Wolves Were Running"

Plot 
Kay Harker is returning from boarding school when he finds himself mixed up in a battle to possess a magical box. It allows the owner to shrink in size, to fly swiftly, to go into the past and to experience the magical wonders contained within the box.

The current owner of the box is an old Punch and Judy man called Cole Hawlings whom Kay meets at the railway station. They develop an instant rapport, which leads Cole to confide that he is being chased by a magician called Abner Brown and his gang, which includes Kay's former governess. For safety, Cole (who turns out to be the medieval philosopher and alleged magician Ramon Llull) entrusts the box to Kay. The schoolboy then goes on to have many adventures as he protects the box from those who wish to use it for bad deeds.

Adaptations

BBC radio 
There have been several radio adaptations of The Box of Delights.

Children's Hour

This six-part adaptation, with a script by Robert Holland and John Keir Cross, was produced three times by the BBC as part of its Children's Hour, in 1943, 1948 and 1955.

It used as incidental music the "Carol Symphony" by Victor Hely-Hutchinson

1943 
Kay Harker: John Gilpin
Abner Brown: Robert Farquharson
Cole Hawlings: Hay Petrie
Rat: Philip Wade
Mouse: Charles Hawtrey
Narrator: Norman Shelley
Peter Jones: Peter Mullins
Jemima Jones: Sheila Potts
Maria Jones: Dorothy Gordon
Caroline Louisa: Joan Carol
Foxy man: Malcolm Graeme and Gibb McLaughlin
Chubby man: Wilfred Babbage
Sylvia Pouncer: Joan Young
Inspector: Dick Francis
Rogers: Malcolm Graeme
The Head: Arthur Bush

1948 
Kay Harker: David Page
Cole Hawlings: Harcourt Williams
Caroline Louisa: Rosemary Davis
Foxy Man: Carleton Hobbs
Chubby Man: Wilfred Babbage
Peter Jones: David Spenser
Maria Jones: Dorothy Gordon
Jemima Jones: Audrey Blair
Porter: Preston Lockwood
Sylvia Pouncer: Gladys Young
Rat: David Kossoff
The Inspector: Dick Francis
Pirate: Arthur Bush
Mouse: Charles Hawtrey
Thomson: Arthur Bush
Narrator: Norman Shelley

1955 
Kay Harker: Patricia Hayes
Cole Hawlings: Deering Wells
Caroline Louisa: Rosemary Davis
The Foxy Man: Carleton Hobbs
The Chubby Man: Wilfred Babbage
Porter: Eric Lugg
Peter Jones: William Simons
Maria Jones: Dorothy Gordon
Jemima Jones: Marise Hepworth
Rat: Ernest Jay
The Inspector: Frank Atkinson
Rum Chops: Arthur Bush
Mouse: Charles Hawtrey
The Bishop's Sister: Susan Richards
Ellen: Janet Morrison
The Head: Arthur Bush
Narrator: Norman Shelley

Saturday Night Theatre
This was a one-off drama, with a script by John Keir Cross, broadcast in 1966, and repeated in 1968 and 1969. It was then remade with a new cast in 1977.

1966
Kay Harker (a man): Harman Grisewood
Kay Harker (a boy): Patricia Hayes
Cole Hawlings: Cyril Shaps
Foxy-faced man: Henry Stamp
Chubby man: Wilfred Babbage
Miss Caroline Louisa: Carol Marsh
The Lady of the Ring: Noel Howe
Maria Jones: Jo Manning Wilson
Susan Jones: Sian Davies
Peter Jones: Eva Hadbon
The Bishop: Preston Lockwood
Abner Brown: Felix Felton
Rat: Norman Shelley
Alf Rat: Stanley Unwin
Police Inspector: Hector Ross
Sylvia Daisy Pouncer: Joan Matheson

1977
Kay Harker (a man): David Davis
Kay Harker (a boy): Jean English
Abner Brown: Heron Carvic
Cole Hawlings: Cyril Shaps
Foxy Man: Roy Spencer
Chubby Man: Paul Meier
Caroline Louisa: Irene Sutcliffe
Sylvia Daisy Pouncer: Kathleen Helmk
Rat: Norman Shelley
Lady of the Ring: Grizelda Hervet
Inspector: Rod Beacham
Jemima Jones: Nicolette McKenzie
Maria Jones: Anne Rosenfeld
Susan Jones: Jane Knowles
Peter Jones: Judy Bennett
Bishop: Lewis Stringer
The boy: John Levitt
The Bronze Head: John Gabriel

Radio 4

1995
Two-part drama with a script by John Peacock.
Abner Brown: Donald Sinden
Cole Hawlins: Lionel Jeffries

BBC Television 1984

A BBC TV adaptation of The Box of Delights was broadcast in six parts between 21 November and 24 December in 1984. It starred Devin Stanfield, Patrick Troughton and Robert Stephens as Kay Harker, Cole Hawlings and Abner Brown respectively and adapted for television by Alan Seymour, directed by Renny Rye and produced by Paul Stone.

It featured an innovative mixture of live action and animation, in particular Quantel Paintbox and chroma key effects. The series cost £1-million to make in 1984, the most expensive children's series the BBC had made to that date, but it was widely acclaimed and won a number of BAFTA and RTS awards, in particular for its special effects.

The opening and closing title music features an orchestral arrangement of "The First Nowell" extracted from the third movement of the Carol Symphony by Victor Hely-Hutchinson. It had been used for earlier radio adaptations and has become synonymous with the story.

Big Finish 2021 
Big Finish Productions produced an audio play of The Box of Delights, which was released on CD and download in June 2021, starring Derek Jacobi, Mark Gatiss and David Warner. The script was adapted by Christopher William Hill.

Opera
John Masefield adapted an opera libretto from his book, also incorporating elements of The Midnight Folk, which was eventually set to music in the late 1980s by the British composer Robert Steadman.

Theatre 
Wilton's Music Hall presented an adaptation by Piers Torday between 1 December 2017 and 6 January 2018. Billed as a world stage premiere, the production was directed by Justin Audibert and designed by Tom Piper. The production was reprised, with a new cast, between 30 November 2018 and 5 January 2019.

References

Flynn, Simon: "A Magic Curiously Suited to Radio?": The BBC and The Box of Delights. The Journal of the John Masefield Society, No. 12 (May 2003), pp. 21–35.

External links
 "Sea Fever", "Cargoes" and other examples of Masefield's poetry

1935 British novels
1935 fantasy novels
Novels by John Masefield
Children's fantasy novels
Heinemann (publisher) books
Novels adapted into operas
British novels adapted into television shows
Fictional cubes